PunisherMAX is the second comic book ongoing series published under the MAX imprint of Marvel Comics featuring vigilante and anti-hero the Punisher. The series was written by Jason Aaron and drawn by Steve Dillon.

Unlike the concurrently running Marvel Universe-proper series featuring the Punisher, the MAX imprint allows the creators the freedom to write more realistic and hard-edged stories that cannot be seen in regular mainline Marvel Universe stories. Also unlike the previous MAX series, which focused mainly on Frank Castle/The Punisher's war against the mob, this series has him squaring off against MAX versions of popular Marvel super villains' such as Wilson Fisk/the Kingpin, Bullseye and Elektra. The series came to a conclusion with issue #22.

The series was a primary influence on Marvel's Netflix television series Daredevil and the second season of its spin-off The Punisher, both set in the Marvel Cinematic Universe (MCU), the former in terms of the characterisation of Vanessa Marianna-Fisk (portrayed by Ayelet Zurer), and the latter in the adaptation of the Mennonite, John Pilgrim (portrayed by Josh Stewart).

Story arcs

"Kingpin" (#1-5)
Interrogating a mobster, the Punisher discovers a meeting place where many of them will be in the same place. After the meeting with the mob bosses, the men determine that the mythic "Kingpin of Crime" should be fabricated by them in order to throw the Punisher off their trails. One of the bosses' bodyguards, Wilson Fisk, is apparently chosen as this new figurehead. When the Punisher crashes the meeting, Fisk gets the bosses to safety and has a chance to kill the Punisher, which he does not take. He goes home to his wife and sleeping child, when he receives the call that will seat him as the Kingpin. Smiling, hinting at an ulterior motive, he accepts.

"Bullseye" (#6-11)
Immediately after Wilson Fisk becomes the "Kingpin of Crime", he cancels all of the former bosses' appointments. However, Fisk's secretary calls and informs him that one man refuses to have his appointment cancelled. The man is known only as Bullseye, the world's deadliest assassin. Bullseye never misses his target, and has set his sights on the Punisher.

"Frank" (#12-16)
After the cruel fight against Bullseye, Frank gets arrested and sent to a high-security prison with a thousand people who want nothing more than to see him dead. Frank reflects back on his time during the war and immediately after returning home, while struggling to understand his Punisher persona and refusing offers from crime bosses. He contemplates a life of peace versus continuing his violent methods.

"Homeless" (#17-21)
Frank escapes prison and goes into his final confrontation with Wilson Fisk a.k.a. the Kingpin of Crime, and his new bodyguard, Elektra.

"War's End" (#22)
The series concludes with issue #22, which covers the death, funeral, and burial of Frank Castle. At the end of issue #22, the Punisher's death sparks a public uprising, with citizens purging New York's criminals.

Reception
The series holds an average rating of 8.6 by 85 professional critics on the review aggregation website Comic Book Roundup.

Prints

Issues

Specials

Collected editions

References

External links

 

2009 comics debuts
2012 comics endings
Comics by Jason Aaron
Comics set in New York City